Marissa Whitley (born January 11, 1983) is a former Miss Teen USA, having won the 2001 title representing the state of Missouri. Born in Los Angeles, California, to an African-American father and European-American mother. The youngest of four, Marissa moved to Springfield, Missouri at age three after the premature death of her mother and was raised by her aunt while her older siblings were split among other family members. At age 5, Marissa's father was killed in a drive by shooting in Los Angeles before they had the chance to meet. She was the first titleholder from that state to win the national competition.

After winning Miss Merrie Christmas for scholarship money her junior year, she was given an entry form by her older sister and decided to compete in the Miss Missouri Teen USA Pageant. Whitley won her first title, Miss Missouri Teen USA in 2000, and reigned until she won the Miss Teen USA 2001 title. She captured the state title along with the award for Miss Congeniality and set her sights on the national title following graduation. With her sassy attitude and warm personality, Marissa's dream came true as she made history at 18 and became the first winner from Missouri to capture the national title during the 19th Annual Miss Teen USA 2001 Competition, airing live on CBS.

Marissa Whitley remained in New York City where she worked for MTV Networks on the College Television Network and as a commercial print model for Ford Models. She continued to speak at events around the country.

References

Living people
Miss Teen USA winners
2001 beauty pageant contestants
21st-century Miss Teen USA delegates
Female models from California
Female models from Missouri
Models from Los Angeles
People from Springfield, Missouri
1983 births
African-American beauty pageant winners
African-American female models
21st-century African-American women
21st-century African-American people